Stromatium barbatum (common names: teak trunk borer and Kulsi teak borer) is a species of beetle in the family Cerambycidae.
This species is native to the Oriental region. It has been recorded in mainland India, the Andaman Islands, Myanmar, Sri Lanka, Mauritius, Réunion and Seychelles. This species has also spread to continental Africa and  Madagascar.

Description

Length: .
Breadth: .

Natural history
Stromatium barbatum is extremely polyphagous; the list of recorded host plants exceeds 300. It prefers seasoned timbers, and is commonly found in household furniture, rafters, door and window frames, and other wooden structures. It is considered as an important timber pest species.

References

Hesperophanini
Beetles described in 1775
Taxa named by Johan Christian Fabricius